Marijan Lipovšek (Ljubljana 26 January 1910 – 25 December 1995) was a Slovenian composer, pianist, and teacher.

A native of Ljubljana, he studied music in that city before heading to Prague in 1932; among his teachers were Pavel Šivic, Josef Suk, and Alois Hába. He later taught at the Ljubljana Academy of Music. He was father of the mezzo-soprano Marjana Lipovšek.

References

See also
List of Slovenian composers

1910 births
1995 deaths
Slovenian composers
Male composers
Slovenian classical pianists
Prešeren Award laureates
Golden Arena winners
Slovenian photographers
Academic staff of the University of Ljubljana
Musicians from Ljubljana
20th-century pianists
20th-century composers
Slovenian male musicians